Harry Lovett Williams (June 5, 1905 – May, 1964) was an American Negro league baseball infielder and manager in the 1930s and 1940s.

A native of Sparks, Georgia, Williams made his Negro leagues debut in 1931 with the Indianapolis ABCs and Pittsburgh Crawfords. He was a player-manager for the New York Black Yankees in 1944, and managed the team again in 1950. His brother Roy S. Williams also played in the Negro leagues. Williams died in 1964 at age 58.

References

External links
 and Baseball-Reference Black Baseball stats and Seamheads

1905 births
1964 deaths
Baltimore Elite Giants players
Baltimore Black Sox players
Brooklyn Eagles players
Harrisburg Stars players
Homestead Grays players
Indianapolis ABCs (1931–1933) players
Newark Eagles players
New York Black Yankees players
New York Cubans players
Pittsburgh Crawfords players
20th-century African-American sportspeople
Baseball infielders